Eriolaena lushingtonii is a species of flowering plant in the family Malvaceae. It is found only in Andhra Pradesh and Tamil Nadu in India. It is threatened by habitat loss.

References

lushingtonii
Flora of Andhra Pradesh
Flora of Tamil Nadu
Vulnerable plants
Taxonomy articles created by Polbot